The Muslim American Public Affairs Council (MAPAC) is an American-Muslim political and public advocacy group headquartered in Raleigh, North Carolina. MAPAC began having annual fundraisers in 2003. 

The mission of MAPAC is two-fold. First, it is focused on Political Affairs to participate in the political process in order to "Influence policies affecting Muslims, provide Islamic perspectives on various issues, and defend the civil rights of Muslims." Second, it is focused on Media to develop a working relationship with the media in order to "Present Islamic viewpoints on political and social issues, respond to defamation and misinformation of Islam and Muslims, and educate media personnel about Islam and Muslims."

MAPAC is one of the newer American Muslim advocacy group in the United States.  It has hosted a number of progressive speakers, and recently brought Nihad Awad, Norman Finkelstein, and Cindy Sheehan.

MAPAC-Live TV

MAPAC has its own regular television program in the Research Triangle called MAPAC-Live TV.  It discusses current issues of local, national, and international topics.  Guest panelists include both non-Muslim and Muslim individuals.  The goal of the program is to give the media a Muslim voice and shed light on the misconceptions of Muslims and Islam.

MAPAC announced Marc Conaghan as their first Executive Director in January 2007.

References

External links
MAPAC website

Islamic organizations based in the United States
Organizations based in Raleigh, North Carolina